Heinz-Josef Kehr (born 18 December 1950 in Brühl, North Rhine-Westphalia, died 19 November 2014) was a professional German footballer.

Kehr made 187 appearances and scored 78 goals in the 2. Fußball-Bundesliga for Alemannia Aachen, Tennis Borussia Berlin and Rot-Weiss Essen during his playing career.

References

External links 
 

1950 births
2014 deaths
People from Brühl (Rhineland)
Sportspeople from Cologne (region)
German footballers
Association football forwards
2. Bundesliga players
Alemannia Aachen players
Tennis Borussia Berlin players
Rot-Weiss Essen players
Footballers from North Rhine-Westphalia
20th-century German people